The 1973 British National Track Championships were a series of track cycling competitions held from 28 July – 4 August 1973 at the Leicester Velodrome.

Medal summary

Men's Events

Women's Events

References

1973 in British sport
July 1973 sports events in the United Kingdom
August 1973 sports events in the United Kingdom